Parippally is a village in Kalluvathukal Panchayath of Kollam district, Kerala, India. Paripally village is situated  South of Kollam City along NH66 and  North of Trivandrum along NH66.
Kollam Govt. Medical College is situated in Parippally.

Transportation 

Paravur Railway Station is the nearest railway station to Parippally. Paravur is well connected to Bengaluru, Chennai, Mumbai, Salem, Madurai, Kanyakumari, Mangalore, Coimbatore, Pune, Tirunelveli, Trichy and various towns in Kerala through Indian Railways. It is the nearest railway station to the newly inaugurated Kollam Medical College, Parippally.

There are 4 major roads which connect Madathara, Paravur, Kollam, Thiruvananthapuram. It is only 13 kilometers away from the famous Varkala Sivagiri, Varkala Beach, and Varkala Temple.

Administration

Parippally is the part of Kalluvathukkal Panchayath.

Schools
Famous schools, ASHSS Parippally. UKF Engineering College is in Parippally.
Govt Medical College, Kollam is situated in Paripally.

Temples
One of the most famous temple in Parippally is Kodimoottil Sri Bhadrakaali Temple . Gajamela and Pongala which are associated with the temple festival are very famous. Thousands of devotees come to watch the Gajamela.

References
 Kerala Atlas
 Manorama year book: 2006

External links
 Parippally Gajamela

 http://www.census2011.co.in/data/village/628437-parippally-kerala.html

Villages in Kollam district